The 1973 CONCACAF Champions' Cup was the 9th edition of the annual international club football competition held in the CONCACAF region (North America, Central America and the Caribbean), the CONCACAF Champions' Cup. It determined that year's club champion of association football in the CONCACAF region. The tournament was originally scheduled to be played by 16 teams of 9 countries from 1 June till 3 August 1973 with the matches in the tournament played under the home/away match, but a final series was set up for January 8 and 10, 1974, after no team from either of the other two sections participated.

The teams were split into zones (North American, Central American and Caribbean), each one qualifying the winner to participate in the final tournament. As no clubs entered in the North American section, the winner of the two remaining zones gained the qualification to the final, but both Central American teams withdrew; therefore the final was scratched and the Caribbean winner, Transvaal from Suriname, won the tournament, becoming CONCACAF champion for the first time.

North American Zone
The zone was cancelled as no clubs entered.

Central American Zone

First round

Saprissa, Alajuelense and Comunicaciones advanced to the Central American Zone second round. 
1 CSD Municipal later withdrew. 
2 The match was abandoned in the 68th minute with Alajuelense leading 1–0 due to torrential rain which flooded the pitch; the result was allowed to stand.

Second round

1Deportivo Santa Cecilia replaced Municipal, who withdrew. 
Saprissa and Alajuelense advance to the Central American Zone third round.

Third round

Saprissa won the series, but later withdrew.

Caribbean Zone

First round

Bye: S.V. SUBT

Second round

1 Devonshire Colts withdrew.
 Transvaal and Jong Colombia advance to the third round.

Third round

Fourth round

1 Devonshire Colts were reinstated as all other clubs from the Central Zone withdrew, since the Northern Zone had been cancelled due to no clubs having entered.

CONCACAF Final Round
The final was scratched and  Transvaal. winners of the Caribbean Zone, were declared CONCACAF Champions in that Central American finalist Saprissa had withdrawn after December 15, 1973.

Champion

References

1
CONCACAF Champions' Cup